Florenton is an unincorporated community in Wuori Township, Saint Louis County, Minnesota, United States; located near Britt.

The community is located eight miles northeast of the city of Virginia at the intersection of State Highway 169 (MN 169) and Saint Louis County Road 303 (Trillium Road). U.S. Highway 53 is nearby.

Florenton is located within the Superior National Forest.

References

 Rand McNally Road Atlas – 2007 edition – Minnesota entry
 Official State of Minnesota Highway Map – 2011/2012 edition
 Minnesota DOT map of Saint Louis County – Sheet 3 – 2011 edition

Unincorporated communities in Minnesota
Unincorporated communities in St. Louis County, Minnesota